Pterodiscus may refer to:
 Pterodiscus (plant), a genus of plants in the family Pedaliaceae
 Pterodiscus, a genus of fishes in the family Gasteropelecidae, synonym of Gasteropelecus
 Pterodiscus, a genus of gastropods in the family Amastridae, synonym of Tropidoptera